El gato tuerto is a Venezuelan telenovela created Germán Pérez Nahim and adapted by César Sierra for Televen. The show is the first telenovela produced by Televen, and premiered on 5 November 2007 registering high audience levels with a total of 34% share. It stars Sabrina Seara and Andrés Scarioni.

Synopsis 
Gato Tuerto is a comedy that is nourished by what happens daily in a television station. Stories of love, healthy or alienated desire for success, professionalism, ego, in short a whole world as a novel in which tragicomedy abounds.

Cast 
 Sabrina Seara as María Amatista
 Andres Scarioni as Daniel / El Gato
 Alexandra Rodríguez as Sabrina
 Ana Karina Casanova as La Gata
 Willy Martín as Andy Bizot
 Pastor Oviedo as Alejandro
 Jamie Sasson as Victoria
 Javier Valcárcel as Ignacio
 Henry Zakka as César
 Mariam Valero as Scarlett

References

External links 
 

2007 telenovelas
Spanish-language telenovelas
Televen telenovelas
2007 Venezuelan television series debuts
2008 Venezuelan television series endings
Venezuelan telenovelas
Television shows set in Venezuela